is a former Japanese football player.

Club statistics

References

External links

1985 births
Living people
Association football people from Gifu Prefecture
Japanese footballers
J1 League players
Japan Football League players
Yokohama F. Marinos players
FC Gifu players
Association football midfielders